The 2008–09 Detroit Red Wings season was the 83rd season for the National Hockey League (NHL) franchise that was established on September 25, 1926. 
The Detroit Red Wings attempted to defend their Stanley Cup title, but they were defeated by the Pittsburgh Penguins in seven games in the Stanley Cup Finals, the team they defeated in the finals the previous season. The Red Wings roster featured former Penguin Marian Hossa, who signed a one-year contract with Detroit during the summer of 2008, as well as former Penguins backup Ty Conklin.

They won 51 games during the regular season, the fourth consecutive season of 50 or more victories.

Off-season
June 9: Dominik Hasek announced his retirement from the NHL.

June 10: Detroit signed head coach Mike Babcock to three-year contract extension.

June 11: Assistant coach Todd McLellan signed with the San Jose Sharks as their new head coach.

June 30: The Detroit Red Wings re-signed defenseman Andreas Lilja to a two-year contract.

July 1: Brad Stuart re-signed with the Detroit Red Wings. It is a four-year deal worth $3.75 million per season, and a no-trade clause for the first two.

July 2: Marian Hossa signed a one-year, $7.45 million contract.

July 15: Dallas Drake announced his retirement from the NHL.

July 23: Ryan Oulahen re-signed with the Detroit Red Wings with a one-year deal.

July 30: Valtteri Filppula re-signed on a five-year, $15 million contract.

Regular season
Excluding six shootout-winning goals, the Red Wings scored 289 goals during the regular season, the most of all 30 teams in the NHL. They also scored the most power-play goals, with 90, and had the best power-play percentage, at 25.50% (90 for 353).

Divisional standings

Conference standings

Schedule and results

|- align="center"  bgcolor="#ffffff"
| 1 || September 24 || Montreal || 3 – 2 || Detroit || SO || Howard || 15,319 || 0–0–1 
|- align="center"  bgcolor="#CCFFCC" 
| 2 || September 25 || Detroit || 4 – 3 || Boston ||  || Larsson ||  || 1–0–1
|- align="center"  bgcolor="#ffbbbb" 
| 3 || September 26 || Boston || 2 – 1 || Detroit ||  || Conklin || 15,266 || 1–1–1
|- align="center"  bgcolor="#CCFFCC" 
| 4 || September 28 || Atlanta || 0 – 4 || Detroit ||  || Osgood || 17,714 || 2–1–1
|- align="center"  bgcolor="#ffffff"
| 5 || September 30 || Detroit || 1 – 2 || Montreal || SO || Howard || 21,273 || 2–1–2
|- align="center"  bgcolor="#CCFFCC" 
| 6 || October 1 || Detroit || 4 – 1 || Atlanta ||  || Osgood || 10,817 || 3–1–2
|- align="center"  bgcolor="#CCFFCC" 
| 7 || October 3 || Toronto || 3 – 5 || Detroit ||  || Conklin || 17,913 || 4–1–2
|- align="center"  bgcolor="#CCFFCC" 
| 8 || October 4 || Detroit || 4 – 3 || Toronto ||  || Osgood || 18,878 || 5–1–2
|- align="center"  bgcolor="#CCFFCC"
| 9 || October 5 || Buffalo || 0 – 3 || Detroit ||  || Conklin || 15,983 || 6–1–2
|-

|- align="center"  bgcolor="#ffbbbb" 
| 1 || October 9 || Toronto || 3 – 2 || Detroit ||  || Osgood || 20,066 || 0–1–0 || 0
|- align="center"  bgcolor="#CCFFCC"
| 2 || October 11 || Detroit || 3 – 2 || Ottawa ||  || Osgood || 20,182 || 1–1–0 || 2
|- align="center"  bgcolor="#CCFFCC"
| 3 || October 13 || Detroit || 3 – 1 || Carolina ||  ||Conklin || 18,680 || 2–1–0 ||4 
|- align="center"  bgcolor="#ffffff"
| 4 || October 16 || Vancouver || 4 – 3 || Detroit || OT || Osgood || 19,011 || 2–1–1 || 5
|- align="center"  bgcolor="#CCFFCC" 
| 5 || October 18 || NY Rangers || 4 – 5 || Detroit || OT || Osgood ||20,066 || 3–1–1|| 7
|- align="center" bgcolor="#CCFFCC"
| 6 || October 22 || Detroit || 4 – 3 || St. Louis ||  || Conklin || 19,150 || 4–1–1 || 9
|- align="center"  bgcolor="#CCFFCC"
| 7 || October 24 || Atlanta || 5 – 3 || Detroit ||  || Osgood || 20,066 || 5–1–1 || 11
|- align="center" bgcolor="#CCFFCC"
| 8 || October 25 || Detroit || 6 – 5 || Chicago || SO || Conklin || 22,690 || 6–1–1 || 13
|- align="center" bgcolor="#CCFFCC"
| 9 || October 27 || Detroit || 4 – 3 || Los Angeles || SO || Osgood || 17,671 || 7–1–1 || 15
|- align="center" bgcolor="#ffffff"
| 10 || October 29 || Detroit || 4 – 5 || Anaheim || OT || Osgood || 17,174 || 7–1–2 || 16
|- align="center" bgcolor="#ffbbbb"
| 11 || October 30 || Detroit || 2 – 4 || San Jose ||  || Conklin || 17,496 || 7–2–2 || 16
|-

|- align="center" bgcolor="#CCFFCC"
| 12 || November 2 || Detroit || 3 – 2 || Vancouver ||  || Osgood || 18,630 || 8–2–2 || 18
|- align="center" bgcolor="#CCFFCC"
| 13 || November 8 || New Jersey || 1 – 3 || Detroit ||  || Osgood || 20,066 || 9–2–2 || 20
|- align="center" bgcolor="#ffffff"
| 14 || November 11 || Pittsburgh || 7 – 6 || Detroit || OT || Osgood || 20,066 || 9–2–3 || 21
|- align="center" bgcolor="#CCFFCC"
| 15 || November 13 || Detroit || 4 – 3 || Tampa Bay ||  || Osgood || 20,544 || 10–2–3 || 23
|- align="center" bgcolor="#CCFFCC"
| 16 || November 14 || Detroit || 3 – 2 || Florida ||  || Conklin || 18,637 || 11–2–3 || 25
|- align="center" bgcolor="#CCFFCC"
| 17 || November 17 || Edmonton || 0 – 4 || Detroit ||  || Conklin || 18,934 || 12–2–3 || 27
|- align="center" bgcolor="#CCFFCC"
| 18 || November 20 || Detroit || 4 – 3 || Edmonton ||  || Osgood || 16,839 || 13–2–3 || 29 
|- align="center" bgcolor="#CCFFCC"
| 19 || November 22 || Detroit || 5 – 2 || Calgary ||  || Conklin || 19,289 || 14–2–3 || 31
|- align="center" bgcolor="#ffffff"
| 20 || November 24 || Detroit || 2 – 3 || Vancouver || OT || Osgood || 18,630 || 14–2–4 || 32
|- align="center" bgcolor="#ffbbbb"
| 21 || November 26 || Montreal || 3 – 1 || Detroit ||  || Conklin || 20,066 || 14–3–4 || 32
|- align="center" bgcolor="#CCFFCC"
| 22 || November 28 || Columbus || 3 – 5 || Detroit ||  || Osgood || 20,066 || 15–3–4 || 34 
|- align="center" bgcolor="ffbbbb"
| 23 || November 29 || Detroit || 1 – 3 || Boston ||  || Conklin || 17,565 || 15–4–4 || 34
|-

|- align="center" bgcolor="#CCFFCC"
| 24 || December 1 || Anaheim || 1 – 2  || Detroit ||  || Osgood || 18,862 || 16–4–4 || 36
|- align="center" bgcolor="#CCFFCC"
| 25 || December 4 || Vancouver || 5 – 6  || Detroit ||  || Osgood  || 19,116  || 17–4–4  || 38
|- align="center" bgcolor="#CCFFCC"
| 26 || December 6 || Chicago || 4 – 5 || Detroit || SO || Conklin || 20,066 || 18–4–4 || 40
|- align="center" bgcolor="#CCFFCC"
| 27 || December 10 || Calgary || 4 – 3 || Detroit || OT || Conklin || 19,335 || 19–4–4 || 42
|- align="center" bgcolor="ffbbbb"
| 28 || December 12 || Detroit || 1 – 3 || Dallas ||  || Conklin || 18,532 || 19–5–4 || 42
|- align="center" bgcolor="CCFFCC"
| 29 || December 13 || Detroit || 5 – 4 || Phoenix || SO || Osgood || 16,339 || 20–5–4 || 44
|- align="center" bgcolor="ffbbbb"
| 30 || December 15 || Colorado || 3 – 2 || Detroit ||  || Osgood || 19,154 || 20–6–4 || 44
|- align="center" bgcolor="#CCFFCC"
| 31 || December 18 || San Jose || 0 – 6 || Detroit ||  || Conklin || 19,507 || 21–6–4 || 46
|- align="center" bgcolor="#CCFFCC"
| 32 || December 20 || Los Angeles || 4 – 6 || Detroit ||  || Conklin || 19,784 || 22–6–4 || 48
|- align="center" bgcolor="CCFFCC"
| 33 || December 23 || St. Louis || 1 – 4 || Detroit ||  || Conklin || 20,066 || 23–6–4 || 50
|- align="center" bgcolor="ffbbbb"
| 34 || December 26 || Detroit || 2 – 3 || Nashville ||  || Conklin || 17,113 || 23–7–4 || 50
|- align="center" bgcolor="ffffff"
| 35 || December 27 || Detroit || 3 – 4 || Colorado || SO || Conklin || 18,007 || 23–7–5 || 51
|- align="center" bgcolor="CCFFCC"
| 36 || December 30 || Chicago || 0 – 4 || Detroit ||  || Conklin || 20,066 || 24–7–5 || 53
|-

|- align="center" bgcolor="#CCFFCC"
| 37 || January 1 || Detroit || 6 – 4 || Chicago ||  || Conklin || 40,818 || 25–7–5 || 55
|- align="center" bgcolor="#CCFFCC"
| 38 || January 3 || Detroit || 3 – 2  || Minnesota || SO || Osgood || 18,568 || 26–7–5 || 57
|- align="center" bgcolor="#CCFFCC"
| 39 || January 6 || Columbus || 0 – 3 || Detroit ||  || Conklin || 19,717 || 27–7–5 || 59
|- align="center" bgcolor="#CCFFCC"
| 40 || January 8 || Dallas || 1 – 6 || Detroit ||  || Osgood || 20,066 || 28–7–5 || 61
|- align="center" bgcolor="#CCFFCC"
| 41 || January 10 || Buffalo || 1 – 3 || Detroit ||  || Conklin || 20,066 || 29–7–5 || 63
|- align="center" bgcolor="#ffffff"
| 42 || January 12 || Detroit || 4 – 5 || Dallas || OT || Osgood || 17,648 || 29–7–6 || 64
|- align="center" bgcolor="CCFFCC"
| 43 || January 14 || Detroit || 4 – 3 || Anaheim ||  || Osgood || 17,525 || 30–7–6 || 66
|- align="center" bgcolor="CCFFCC"
| 44 || January 15 || Detroit || 4 – 0 || Los Angeles ||  || Conklin || 18,118 || 31–7–6 || 68
|- align="center" bgcolor="ffbbbb"
| 45 || January 17 || Detroit || 5 – 6 || San Jose ||  || Osgood || 17,496 || 31–8–6 || 68
|- align="center" bgcolor="ffbbbb"
| 46 || January 20 || Detroit || 3 – 6 || Phoenix ||  || Conklin || 16,368 || 31–9–6 || 68
|- align="center" bgcolor="ffffff"
| 47 || January 27 || Detroit || 2 – 3 || Columbus || OT || Osgood || 16,348 || 31–9–7 || 69
|- align="center" bgcolor="ffbbbb"
| 48 || January 29 || Dallas || 2 – 4 || Detroit ||  || Osgood || 20,066 || 31–10–7 || 69
|- align="center" bgcolor="ffbbbb"
| 49 || January 31 || Detroit || 2 – 4 || Washington ||  || Conklin || 18,277 || 31–11–7 || 69
|-
| style="font-size:88%; text-align:left;" colspan=9 | |2009 NHL Winter Classic, played at Wrigley Field.
|-

|- align="center" bgcolor="CCFFCC"
| 50 || February 2 || St. Louis || 3 – 4 || Detroit || SO || Osgood || 19,384 || 32–11–7 || 71
|- align="center" bgcolor="CCFFCC"
| 51 || February 4 || Phoenix || 4 – 5 || Detroit ||  || Osgood || 19,821 || 33–11–7 || 73
|- align="center" bgcolor="CCFFCC"
| 52 || February 7 || Edmonton || 3 – 8 || Detroit ||  || Conklin || 20,066 || 34–11–7 || 75
|- align="center" bgcolor="#CCFFCC"
| 53 || February 8 || Detroit || 3 – 0 || Pittsburgh ||  || Conklin || 17,132 || 35–11–7 || 77
|- align="center" bgcolor="#CCFFCC"
| 54 || February 10 || Detroit || 5 – 3 || Nashville ||  || Conklin || 15,077  || 36–11–7 || 79
|- align="center" bgcolor="#CCFFCC"
| 55 || February 12 || Minnesota || 2 – 4 || Detroit ||  || Osgood || 20,066 || 37–11–7 || 81
|- align="center" bgcolor="#ffbbbb"
| 56 || February 13 || Detroit || 2 – 3 || Columbus ||  || Osgood || 18,802 || 37–12–7 || 81
|- align="center" bgcolor="#ffffff"
| 57 || February 15 || Colorado || 6 – 5 || Detroit || SO || Osgood || 20,066 || 37–12–8 || 82
|- align="center" bgcolor="#CCFFCC"
| 58 || February 18 || Nashville || 2 – 6 || Detroit ||  || Conklin || 20,066 || 38–12–8 || 84
|- align="center" bgcolor="#CCFFCC"
| 59 || February 20 || Anaheim || 2 – 5 || Detroit ||  || Conklin || 20,066 || 39–12–8 || 86
|- align="center" bgcolor="#ffbbbb"
| 60 || February 21 || Detroit || 2 – 5 || Minnesota ||  || Howard || 18,568 || 39–13–8 || 86
|- align="center" bgcolor="#CCFFCC"
| 61 || February 25 || San Jose || 1 – 4 || Detroit ||  || Conklin || 20,066 || 40–13–8 || 88
|- align="center" bgcolor="#CCFFCC"
| 62 || February 27 || Los Angeles || 1 – 2 || Detroit ||  || Osgood || 20,066 || 41–13–8  || 90
|- align="center" bgcolor="#ffbbbb"
| 63 || February 28 || Detroit || 0 – 8 || Nashville ||  || Conklin || 17,113 || 41–14–8 || 90
|-

|- align="center" bgcolor="#CCFFCC"
| 64 || March 3 || Detroit || 5 – 0 || St. Louis ||  || Osgood || 19,250 || 42–14–8 || 92
|- align="center" bgcolor="#CCFFCC"
| 65 || March 4 || Detroit || 3 – 2 || Colorado ||  || Conklin || 18,007 || 43–14–8 || 94
|- align="center" bgcolor="#ffbbbb"
| 66 || March 7 || Columbus || 8 – 2 || Detroit ||  || Osgood || 20,066 || 43–15–8 || 94
|- align="center" bgcolor="#CCFFCC"
| 67 || March 10 || Phoenix || 2 – 3 || Detroit || OT || Conklin || 20,066 || 44–15–8 || 96
|- align="center" bgcolor="#ffffff"
| 68 || March 12 || Calgary || 6 – 5 || Detroit || SO || Conklin || 20,066 || 44–15–9 || 97
|- align="center" bgcolor="#CCFFCC"
| 69 || March 14 || Detroit || 5 – 2 || St. Louis ||  || Osgood || 19,250 || 45–15–9 || 99
|- align="center" bgcolor="#CCFFCC"
| 70 || March 15 || Detroit || 4 – 0 || Columbus ||  || Osgood || 18,685 || 46–15–9 || 101
|- align="center" bgcolor="#CCFFCC"
| 71 || March 17 || Philadelphia || 2 – 3 || Detroit ||  || Osgood || 20,066 || 47–15–9 || 103
|- align="center" bgcolor="#CCFFCC"
| 72 || March 20 || Detroit || 6 – 3 || Atlanta ||  || Osgood || 18,545 || 48–15–9 || 105
|- align="center" bgcolor="#ffbbbb"
| 73 || March 23 || Detroit || 3 – 5 || Calgary ||  || Osgood || 19,289 || 48–16–9 || 105
|- align="center" bgcolor="#CCFFCC"
| 74 || March 24 || Detroit || 3 – 2 || Edmonton ||  || Conklin || 16,839 || 49–16–9 || 107
|- align="center" bgcolor="#ffbbbb"
| 75 || March 27 || NY Islanders || 2 – 0 || Detroit ||  || Osgood || 20,066 || 49–17–9 || 107
|- align="center" bgcolor="#ffbbbb"
| 76 || March 29 || Nashville || 4 – 3 || Detroit ||  || Osgood || 20,066 || 49–18–9 || 107
|-

|- align="center" bgcolor="#ffbbbb"
| 77 || April 2 || St. Louis || 5 – 4 || Detroit ||  || Conklin || 19,935 || 49–19–9 || 107
|- align="center" bgcolor="#CCFFCC"
| 78 || April 5 || Minnesota || 2 – 3 || Detroit ||  || Osgood || 20,066 || 50–19–9 || 109
|- align="center" bgcolor="#CCFFCC"
| 79 || April 6 || Detroit || 4 – 1 || Buffalo ||  || Osgood || 18,690 || 51–19–9 || 111
|- align="center" bgcolor="#ffffff"
| 80 || April 9 || Nashville || 4 – 3 || Detroit || SO || Osgood || 20,066 || 51–19–10 || 112
|- align="center" bgcolor="#ffbbbb"
| 81 || April 11 || Chicago || 4 – 2 || Detroit ||  || Conklin || 20,066 || 51–20–10 || 112
|- align="center" bgcolor="#ffbbbb"
| 82 || April 12 || Detroit || 0 – 3 || Chicago ||  || Osgood || 22,376 || 51–21–10 || 112
|-

|Legend:

Playoffs

Detroit had not missed the post-season since 1989–90. The 2008–09 season was their 18th consecutive playoff season.

|- align="center" bgcolor="#ccffcc"
| 1 || April 16 || Columbus || 1 – 4 || Detroit ||  || Osgood || 20,066 || 1–0 
|- align="center" bgcolor="#ccffcc"
| 2 || April 18 || Columbus || 0 – 4 || Detroit ||  || Osgood || 20,066 || 2–0 
|- align="center" bgcolor="#ccffcc"
| 3 || April 21 || Detroit || 4 – 1 || Columbus ||  || Osgood || 19,219 || 3–0 
|- align="center" bgcolor="#ccffcc"
| 4 || April 23 || Detroit || 6 – 5 || Columbus ||  || Osgood || 18,889 || 4–0 
|-

|- align="center" bgcolor="#ccffcc"
| 1 || May 1 || Anaheim || 2 – 3 || Detroit ||  || Osgood || 20,066 || 1–0 
|- align="center" bgcolor="#ffcccc"
| 2 || May 3 || Anaheim || 4 – 3 || Detroit || 3OT || Osgood ||  20,066  || 1–1 
|- align="center" bgcolor="#ffcccc"
| 3 || May 5 || Detroit || 1 – 2 || Anaheim ||  || Osgood || 17,174 || 1–2 
|- align="center" bgcolor="#ccffcc"
| 4 || May 7 || Detroit || 6 – 3  || Anaheim ||  || Osgood || 17,601 || 2–2 
|- align="center" bgcolor="#ccffcc"
| 5 || May 10 || Anaheim || 1 – 4 || Detroit ||  || Osgood || 20,066 || 3–2 
|- align="center" bgcolor="#ffcccc"
| 6 || May 12 || Detroit || 1 – 2  || Anaheim ||  || Osgood || 17,174 || 3–3 
|- align="center" bgcolor="#ccffcc"
| 7 || May 14 || Anaheim || 3 – 4 || Detroit ||  || Osgood || 20,066 || 4–3 
|-

|- align="center" bgcolor="#ccffcc"
| 1 || May 17 || Chicago || 2 – 5 || Detroit ||  || Osgood || 20,066 || 1–0 
|- align="center" bgcolor="#ccffcc"
| 2 || May 19 || Chicago || 2 – 3 || Detroit || OT || Osgood || 20,066 || 2–0 
|- align="center" bgcolor="#ffcccc"
| 3 || May 22 || Detroit || 3 – 4 || Chicago || OT || Osgood || 22,678 || 2–1 
|- align="center" bgcolor="ccffcc"
| 4 || May 24 || Detroit || 6 – 1 || Chicago || || Conklin || 22,663  ||3–1
|- align="center" bgcolor="ccffcc"
| 5 || May 27 || Chicago || 1 - 2 || Detroit  || OT || Osgood || 20,066 || 4-1
|-

|- align="center" bgcolor="#ccffcc"
| 1 || May 30 || Pittsburgh || 1 – 3 || Detroit ||  || Osgood || 20,066 || 1–0
|- align="center" bgcolor="#ccffcc"
| 2 || May 31 || Pittsburgh || 1 – 3 || Detroit ||  || Osgood || 20,066 || 2–0
|- align="center" bgcolor="ffbbbb"
| 3 || June 2 || Detroit || 2 – 4 || Pittsburgh ||  || Osgood || 17,132 || 2–1
|- align="center" bgcolor="ffbbbb"
| 4 || June 4 || Detroit || 2 – 4 || Pittsburgh || || Osgood || 17,132 || 2–2
|- align="center" bgcolor="ccffcc"
| 5 || June 6 || Pittsburgh || 0 – 5 || Detroit  || || Osgood || 20,066 || 3–2
|- align="center" bgcolor="ffbbbb"
| 6 || June 9 || Detroit || 1 – 2 || Pittsburgh || || Osgood || 17,132 || 3–3
|- align="center" bgcolor="ffbbbb"
| 7 || June 12 || Pittsburgh || 2 - 1 || Detroit  || || Osgood || 20,066 || 3–4
|-

| Legend:  

During the Finals, Head Coach Mike Babcock joined Mike Keenan as the only coaches in NHL history to coach in Game 7 Stanley Cup Finals on two different teams, having been with the Mighty Ducks of Anaheim in 2003. When the Red Wings lost Game 7, Babcock had the unfortunate distinction of becoming the first coach in NHL history to lose a Game 7 Stanley Cup Finals on two different teams, as his Ducks lost to the New Jersey Devils in 2003.

Player statistics

Skaters

Goaltenders
Note: GP = Games played; Min = Minutes played; W = Wins; L = Losses; OT = Overtime losses; GA = Goals against; GAA= Goals against average; SA= Shots against; SV= Saves; Sv% = Save percentage; SO= Shutouts

Awards and records

Milestones

Transactions

Free agents

Draft picks
Detroit's selections at the 2008 NHL Entry Draft in Ottawa, Ontario.

Farm teams
The Grand Rapids Griffins of the American Hockey League (AHL) remain the minor league affiliate of the Red Wings for the 2008–09 season.

See also
2008–09 NHL season

References

External links
2008-09 Detroit Red Wings Telecast Schedule

Detroit Red Wings seasons
Detroit Red Wings season, 2008-09
Western Conference (NHL) championship seasons
Detroit
Detroit Red Wings
Detroit Red
Detroit Red